This is a list of newspapers published in, or for, the Wheatbelt region of Western Australia.

The Wheatbelt region, situated close to Perth, is home to a number of popular tourist destinations. Its primary industry is agriculture, and the region has a rich agricultural history. Recently, however, there has been an increase in mining and mineral processing.

Titles

See also 
 List of newspapers in Western Australia
 Gascoyne newspapers
 Goldfields-Esperance newspapers
 Great Southern newspapers
 Kimberley newspapers
 Mid West newspapers
 Pilbara newspapers
 South West newspapers

References 

Lists of newspapers published in Western Australia
Newspapers of the Wheatbelt region of Western Australia